Firestar's Quest is a volume in the Warriors novel series by Erin Hunter.

Firestar's Quest follows Firestar, the leader of ThunderClan, one of the four Clans of cats living in a forest, as he goes on a journey to find the lost fifth Clan, SkyClan. After receiving dreams from the previous leader of SkyClan, Firestar and his mate, Sandstorm, leave ThunderClan to find and rebuild the lost tribe. At the end of the book, the Clan is rebuilt with a leader, medicine cat and territory. It is set in between The Darkest Hour and Midnight.

Firestar's Quest returns to being written from Firestar's point of view as in the original Warriors series, after the subsequent series were written from the perspectives of other characters. The book allowed Hunter Erin to explore the old territories again, having moved to the lake territories in Dawn. An excerpt of Firestar's Quest was released to promote sales of the book, which were very successful. The novel has also received positive critical reception.

Concept and development
Firestar narrated the first six books but, for the later Warriors: The New Prophecy and Warriors: Power of Three series, other cats were chosen to speak.  Firestar was chosen to narrate the special edition. Cherith Baldry wrote Firestar's Quest and Gary Chalk illustrated the book. Erin Hunter has said the novel was a chance to explore the old territories, which had been left behind in the Warriors: The New Prophecy series.

To promote the book, an excerpt was released online on the Warriors website, and later at the back of the Warriors manga volume Warrior's Refuge. AuthorTracker emails mentioned increasingly Firestar’s Quest as the launch date approached. The book was also commonly mentioned in the author chats on Wands and Worlds.

Background
All of the Warriors novels are listed as being written by Erin Hunter. Erin Hunter is a pen name for four people, Victoria Holmes, who creates the storylines and edits, Kate Cary, Cherith Baldry, and Tui Sutherland, who write the books in turns. Chronologically, Firestar's Quest takes place between the first two series—after the events of The Darkest Hour and before Midnight. Firestar's Quest was put under the title Warriors: Super Edition, as a special edition extra long book.

Sequel
After the publication of the novel, Holmes confirmed the possibility of seeing SkyClan again:

SkyClan's Destiny, the third super edition and sequel tells of a civil war in SkyClan and was released on 3 August 2010.
SkyClan was also brought back in the SkyClan and the Stranger manga, including The Rescue, Beyond the Code, and After the Flood. These detail how Sol lived in SkyClan for a time and shows how he came to have such a strong vendetta against the Clans.

Synopsis
Firestar's Quest takes place between The Darkest Hour and Midnight. The novel follows Firestar, leader of ThunderClan (one of four Clans of wild cats living in a fictional forest) on a journey to find a fifth lost Clan of the forest called SkyClan. Firestar and his mate Sandstorm journey upriver in order to rebuild the long-lost Clan. When they arrive at the Clan's former home, they meet Skywatcher, a descendant of SkyClan, who tells them about SkyClan's story, and shows them the Whispering Cave, they also find SkyClan's old home deserted, the caves strangely marked with tiny claw marks resembling those of rats. Firestar gathers together Leafdapple, Sparrowpelt, Sharpclaw, Echosong, Rainfur, Petalnose, Clovertail, Patchfoot, Shortwhisker, Cherrytail, Sagekit, Mintkit, Tinypaw, Rockpaw, and Bouncepaw. Eventually, Firestar re-establishes the Clan and helps the Clan fight the force that destroyed the ancient SkyClan: rats. Though SkyClan emerges victorious, the warrior Rainfur is killed and Firestar loses his second life. As Firestar and Sandstorm prepare to return home, Leafdapple is made the leader and renamed Leafstar on the Sky Rock, which is used to connect to the SkyClan ancestors. Sharpclaw is made deputy of SkyClan, and Echosong becomes the medicine cat.

In the epilogue, Sandstorm and Firestar's new kits are born. They decide to name one Squirrelkit (after her sleek tail), and the other Leafkit (in honor of SkyClan's new leader, Leafstar). SkyClan blood runs through ThunderClan in cats such as Tigerclaw from his ancestor Cloudstar, a leader of SkyClan from when they lived alongside the other four Clans.

Before Firestar left the forest, a whole series of events happened that weren't shown in The New Prophecy. Such events included the warrior Longtail losing his sight when a rabbit clawed his eyes, Willowpelt being killed by a badger, and Bramblepaw receiving his warrior name; Brambleclaw. Additionally, Sootpaw got a new mentor, Thornclaw. This book is also the origin of the prophecy "There will be three, kin of your kin, who hold the power of the stars in their paws." The prophecy was passed on to Firestar by Skywatcher.

Themes
In an AuthorTracker email, Victoria Holmes says that one of the main themes of Firestar's Quest is "two cats are genuinely torn between following the warrior code and doing what they believe is right for themselves". In the book, Firestar is asked to find and rebuild SkyClan which described as Holmes "will take him a long way outside the warrior code and all that he believes in". A review commented that "themes of faith and responsibility give it depth" and also added that "It's quite satisfying watching Firestar and Sandstorm assemble a ragtag group of cats into a true Clan," and compared to movies such as The Bad News Bears to Major League.

Publication history
HarperCollins published the hardcover edition of Firestar's Quest and released it on 21 August 2007. The book had a 150,000 first release. After the release, Erin Hunter went on tour to talk about Firestar's Quest with fans. HarperTrophy, an imprint of HarperCollins, released the paperback version of Firestar's Quest on 13 May 2008. Russia has published a translation of Firestar's Quest. The German version of the book has also been released as both a hardcover and audiobook. The United States, the United Kingdom, and Canada have English versions of Firestar's Quest. Canada launched the book early on 9 August 2007. Firestar's Quest ended up on many bestseller lists, including the New York Times Best Seller list.

Critical reception
A reviewer from Children's Literature gave a very positive review, calling Firestar's Quest a “fantastic extension” to the Warriors series, and near the end of the review, the critic said Firestar's Quest showed that the Warriors books had evolved “from simply entertaining to thought provoking adventures”. A review by Booklist noted the longer length of the book and also praised the mission and new characters introduced in the book. Publishers Weekly also gave a positive review writing "Fans of the Warriors books will excitedly delve into Firestar's Quest, the latest edition to Erin Hunter's bestselling series."

See also

 Warriors (novel series)

References

External links
The official Warriors website

2007 American novels
Warriors (novel series)
American fantasy novels
Novels about cats
HarperCollins books
2007 children's books
American children's books